Wisnu Haryo Putro (born 29 December 1989) is an Italian badminton player. He originally represented Indonesia.

Achievements

BWF International Challenge/Series 
Men's singles

  BWF International Challenge tournament
  BWF International Series tournament
  BWF Future Series tournament

References

External links 
 

1989 births
Living people
People from Pati Regency
Sportspeople from Central Java
Indonesian male badminton players
Indonesian expatriate sportspeople in Italy
Italian people of Indonesian descent
Italian male badminton players